The Double Fortress (相矢倉 or 相櫓 aiyagura) is a shogi opening in which both players construct Fortress formations.

Double Fortress games are the most common type of Fortress games found at all levels of play.

Historical Fortress 

Earlier josekis for Fortress in the Edo period (usually spelled 櫓 at that time) were very different from the current josekis.

In one variation, White delays pushing their rook pawn (whereas Black delays the rook pawn push in the modern era) and there is an early bishop trade before both players' kings are moved into their castles.

In the 1947 Meijin tournament, Masao Tsukada and Yoshio Kimura played an early example of the typical 3. S-77 type of Fortress with 1.P-76 P-84 development found in modern shogi.

1. P-76 P-84 development

3. S-77: Blocking bishop with silver

Blocking White's bishop with a silver (and also defending the eighth file from a possible attack) is an older Fortress joseki, which typically also includes advancing Black's rook pawn.

The more recent joseki advances Black's pawn on the sixth file instead. (See above.)

Classic Fortress 24-Move Set

Classic Fortress 24-Move Set (旧矢倉24手組 kyū yagura nijū-tegumi)

Compared to the New Fortress 24-Move Set, note that the Classic Fortress 24-Move Set is (a) symmetrical where both sides have the same formation and (b) that only Black's formation differs (White's formation is the same in both the old and new josekis.)

Right Gold to 67 variant

Right Gold To 67 (6七金右 roku-nana kin migi)

Spearing the Sparrow

Spearing the Sparrow (雀刺し suzume-zashi)

3. P-66: Blocking bishop with pawn

At move 6, White also has an option to play Climbing Silver by advancing their rook pawn to rank 5. (See: White Climbing Silver.)

New Fortress 24-Move Set

New Fortress 24-Move Set (新矢倉24手組 shin yagura nijū-tegumi)

Quick Fortress castling

Quick Fortress castling

White's Fortress Climbing Silver

Silver-37 variations

After the 24-move set of the Fortress opening, one major branch in the Fortress strategies is the Silver-37 set of variations. Many variations are under this parent variation.

Katō variation

Named after Hifumi Katō.

Waki System

Morishita System

The Morishita System delays moving the right attacking silver to 37 early. Instead, it simply moves the bishop to 68 allowing the king to move into the Fortress castle in subsequent moves.

Other development patterns

1. P-76 P-34 2. P-66 patterns

Additionally, earlier Fortress openings in the first part of the 20th century did not follow from the standard 1. P-76 P-84 opening used today and instead developed from mutual opening of the bishop diagonals with 1. P-76 P-34.

Fortress development from Bishop Exchange

A Fortress position may also be developed from a rejected Bishop Exchange opening. For example, after a Bishop Exchange setup, instead of White trading the bishops off the board, White may choose to reject the bishop trade by closing their bishop diagonal. At this point, both players may convert their left side configurations into Fortress castles by pulling their bishops back and moving their silvers to the 77 and 33 squares. Thus, Black may move their bishop to 68 (or to 59 if their king moves to 69 first) allowing their left silver to move to 77. Likewise, White may move their bishop to 33 (usually triggered by Black pushing their rook pawn to 25), move their left silver to 22, move their bishop to 42 allowing their left silver to move 33.

Although possible, this Fortress development is not very common among professional players. When White rejects the bishop trade in this way, it is more common for White to play a Snowroof position while Black switches to a Fortress position instead of a Double Fortress game.

Game example

Hirokazu Ueno vs Keiji Nishikawa 2008.

See also

 Fortress opening
 Fortress castle
 Static Rook
 Shogi opening

Bibliography

 
 
 
 
 

 
  · Partial translation of 消えた戦法の謎 kieta senpō no nazo by Kiyokazu Katsumata.

References

External links
 How to Defend in Shogi (by Yasuharu Ōyama):
 Basic Formation 4: Yagura
 Basic Formation 5: Gin-yagura
 YouTube Hidetchi's:
 Yagura #1
 Rapid Encountered Yagura, Primitive Climbing Silver
 Shogifan 将棋ファン: Yagura -1 矢倉
 Shogi Openings (professional Akira Nishio's blog):
 About a Yagura castle
 Yagura: Silver-46 Strategy (1)
 Basic Tactics For Breaking Yagura Castle (1)
 Basic Tactics For Breaking Yagura Castle (2)
 Basic Tactics For Breaking Yagura Castle (3)
 Basic Tactics For Breaking Yagura Castle (4)
 Shogi Shack:
 Yagura Intro
 Yagura Silver-3g
 Climbing Silver Against Yagura
 Yoshiharu Habu and Modern Shogi: Chapter 1: Yoshiharu Habu and the Changing Modern Shogi
 Chapter 1: Yoshiharu Habu and the Changing Modern Shogi
 Chapter 6: Akira Watanabe, Who Utilized the Window of Opportunity
 Yamajunn's Basic Shogi Opening:
 Yagura
 Yagura: Yonte Kaku
 Shogi Opening:
 Yagura: Akutsu Style Pawn-55 Rapid Attack
 Yagura: Time Lugging Climbing Silver
 Yagura: 3 Move Bishop Strategy
 Yet Another Shogi Site: 
 Yagura Rapid Attack: Yonenaga/Fujimori style against ▲P35 variation
 Double Yagura: Identical formation
 Quest of the Lost Systems: Yagura: R-2i Formation
 Global Shogi: Double Yagura (AiYagura-相矢倉)
 Shogi Maze:
 Yagura Opening Formation
 Yagura Strategy: How To Build The Formation
 Yagura Strategy: Battle 1
 Yagura Strategy: Battle 2
 Ai-SouYagura: Check Of Sennichite 1
 Ai-SouYagura: Check Of Sennichite 2
 Ai-SouYagura: Check Of Sennichite 3
 Yagura: Gote's Quick Attack With Bogin 1
 Yagura: Gote's Quick Attack With Bogin 2
 Yagura: Silver-3g Strategy
 Yagura: Sente's Quick Battle Opening with Pawn-3e
 Yagura: Yonenaga-ryu Quick Attack
 将棋タウン: 矢倉戦法

Shogi openings
Static Rook openings
Fortress openings